Tsagantegia (meaning Tsagan Teg) is a genus of medium-sized ankylosaurid thyreophoran dinosaur that lived in Asia during the Late Cretaceous period. The genus is monotypic, including only the type species, T. longicranialis. The specimen consists of a very partial individual, comprising the skull and lacking postcranial remains. Since it only preserves the skull, Tsagantegia is mainly characterized by its elongated snout and the flattened facial osteoderms, greatly differing from other ankylosaurs.

Discovery and naming
The holotype specimen, MPC 700/17, is a virtually complete skull that was recovered from the locality Tsagan-Teg (or "White Mountain") of the Bayan Shireh Formation in the southeastern Gobi Desert, Mongolia. It was formally described in 1993 by the Russian paleontologist Tatyana Alekseyevna Tumanova.

Description

Unlike other Asian ankylosaurs, in Tsagantegia the caputegulae (cranial ornamentation) are not subdivided into a mosaic of polygons but are amorphous and flattened; they show some degree of symmetry. The quadratojugal, squamosal and orbital horns are poorly preserved, in contrast with other ankylosaurs. The snout was long and flat with a pointed rostrum (beak); each maxilla preserves approximately 18 alveoli, no teeth were preserved. According to Arbour, Tsagantegia differs from Gobisaurus and Shamosaurus based on the more rounded, U-shaped premaxillary beak and the flat ornamentation.

Classification
Although fragmentary, the phylogenetic position of Tsagantegia can be established. In 2012, Thompson et al. conducted an analysis of almost all known valid ankylosaurs and outgroup taxa at the time. They based their resulting phylogeny on characters representing cranial, post-cranial, and osteodermal anatomy, and details of synapomorphies for each recovered clade. Tsagantegia was found to be closely related to Pinacosaurus and Shamosaurus. In the performed phylogenetic analysis by Arbour and Currie in 2015, below are the results for the analysis:

Paleoecology
 
Tsagantegia was unearthed from the Tsagan Teg locality, which represents part of the Upper Bayan Shireh. Calcite U–Pb analyses seem to confirm the age of the Bayan Shireh Formation from 92 million to 86 million years ago, Cenomanian-Santonian ages. Based on comparisons between the snouts of Tsagantegia and the contemporary Talarurus, these taxa were divided by niche partitioning. In a palatal view, the rostra Talarurus have a broad-like, rectangular shape, while Tsagantegia have a more shovel-like shaped rostra. These morphological differences indicate that Tsagantegia filled the niche of a browser herbivore, while Talarurus was a grazer.

Caliche-based boundary indicates a semi-arid environment and climate, but also, the presence of fluvial and lacustrine sediments are indicators of large rivers and lakes. As interpreted by Hicks et al. 1999, during the times of the Bayan Shireh Formation, large rivers drained the eastern part of the Gobi Desert. Additional to this, fossil fruits remains have been recovered from the Bor Guvé and Khara Khutul localities (Upper and Lower Bayan Shireh, respectively), suggesting the presence of Angiosperm plants.

Tsagantegia shared its habitat with numerous animals from other localities of the formation, compromising dinosaur and non-dinosaur genera; such as the theropods Achillobator, Alectrosaurus, Erlikosaurus, Garudimimus and Segnosaurus; the fellow ankylosaur Talarurus; Marginocephalians: Amtocephale and Graciliceratops; the hadrosauroid Gobihadros, and the large sauropod Erketu. The turtle Lindholmemys, the crocodylomorph Paralligator, unnamed azhdarchids and the shark Hybodus.

See also

 Timeline of ankylosaur research
 Cretaceous Mongolia
 Victoria Arbour

References

Ankylosaurids
Late Cretaceous dinosaurs of Asia
Gobi Desert
Fossil taxa described in 1993
Ornithischian genera